François Vola, guitarist and composer, was born in Nice, France, in 1953. He is a double national (France and USA). He is the godson of Louis Vola (bassist with Django Reinhardt's The Hot Club of France). He started playing guitar semiprofessionally at the age of  14. In 1974, at age 20, he moved to the US, studied bluegrass and swing, and played in several bands.

Vola played on several albums and recorded three of his own, in 1983 Francois Vola with fiddler Byron Berline (Stephen Stills, Linda Ronstadt, The Rolling Stones) and banjoist John Hickman. In 1996 an electric jazz album Old World, New World with mandolinist Emory Lester, and in 1997 A Night in Conover, an acoustic jazz album, with Django's son Babik Reinhardt and Emory Lester.

In the US Vola played on stage with Tony Rice, Wyatt Rice, Byron Berline, David Grisman, Bill Keith, Emory Lester, Babik Reinhardt, Tony Williamson, Dan Crary, Roland White, and others. He played several times at the prestigious Merle Watson fest as well as other festivals and events. He won two awards from the North Carolina school of the arts for his compositions and was invited to play one of his pieces with the North Carolina's Western Piedmont Symphony.

In 1998 Vola moved back to France where he continues his musical career.  Vola plays on guitars that he builds. 
In 2019 he puts out a new Bluegrass CD named "Back To Bluegrass", very  well received by the music magazines.
Back to Bluegrass: http://bluegrassmusic.com/content/2019/reviews/francois-vola/
Back to Bluegrass: https://acousticguitar.com/cd-review-francois-vola-back-to-bluegrass/

References

1953 births
Living people
People from Nice
French jazz guitarists
French male guitarists
French jazz composers
Male jazz composers